The Hopedale Village Historic District encompasses much of the historic 19th century industrial village center of Hopedale, Massachusetts.  Its main focus is the mill complex of the Draper Company at Hopedale and Freedom Streets; the district includes much of northern Hopedale, extending along Dutcher and Freedom Streets, and including the mill pond.  It extends to the south just beyond Mendon Street, including properties on that street from the Milford line west to Hopedale Cemetery.  The district was added to the National Register of Historic Places in 2002. The district has been included as part of the Blackstone River Valley National Historical Park.

See also
National Register of Historic Places listings in Worcester County, Massachusetts

References

Historic districts in Worcester County, Massachusetts
National Register of Historic Places in Worcester County, Massachusetts
Historic districts on the National Register of Historic Places in Massachusetts
Blackstone River Valley National Historical Park